K'Pop (Hangul: 케이팝) was a South Korean boy band that debuted in 2001. They disbanded in 2004 after their third album, Memories. On January 28, 2018, the group had a reunion performance on the show Two Yoo Project - Sugar Man. They appeared in episode 3 of the 2nd season and performed their song "그림자".

Members 
Joomin (주민) – leader, rapper
Donghwa (동화) – rapper
Youngwon (영원) – vocalist
Yoobin (유빈) – rapper
Woohyun (우현) – singer

Discography

Studio albums

References 

South Korean boy bands
South Korean dance music groups